Fort Zumwalt North High School, the first high school established in its Fort Zumwalt School District, is located in O'Fallon, Missouri. Established in 1960 as Fort Zumwalt High School, the school moved to its current location in 1976. "North" was added to the school's name when the district's second high school opened in 1987.

History
The district's high school students attended Wentzville or Saint Charles schools until 1960, when a standalone two-wing high school was built for grades 9–12 at Sonderen Street. In 1967, another wing and a major wing addition were added. After the 1975–1976 school year, the high school swapped addresses with Cool Springs Junior High School, on Cool Springs Road (later renamed Tom Ginnever Avenue). The relocated Cool Springs school then took on the name Central Junior High (and since 1987, North Middle School).

In January 2022, Ronald Entwistle was appointed as Zumwalt North principal, to succeed Joseph Sutton in July 2022.

Athletics
Fort Zumwalt North's football team has a recent history of remarkable success.  During the 2021 season they won their 8th consecutive Conference title (their first title being in 2014), tying a state record for more consecutive conference titles.  They have also won their District title 7 of the last 8 season.  In addition, they made it to the state Final Four a total of 4 of the last 6 seasons, appearing in the State Championship in 2016:

 2020: Final Four (lost to Jackson in the semi's).  11–2 season record.
 2019: Final Four (lost to Carthage in the semi's).  12–1 season record.
 2017: Final Four (lost to Pattonville in the semi's).  12–1 season record.
 2016: Show-Me-Bowl (lost to Vianney).  12–2 season record.

Previously, the Panthers were undefeated during the 2015 season until they lost in the quarterfinals to Battle High School, for an 11–1 overall record. The 2014–15 football season was very similar with a 10–2 overall record. FZ North had a 12–2 overall record in 2016–17, including a win over Battle.

References

External links
 Fort Zumwalt North High School
 Fort Zumwalt North Panther Pride Band

High schools in St. Charles County, Missouri
Educational institutions established in 1960
Public high schools in Missouri
1960 establishments in Missouri